How to Make Love to a Negro Without Getting Tired is a 1989 French-language Canadian drama film directed by , starring Isaach de Bankolé and Maka Kotto, and written by Haitian author Dany Laferrière based on his novel of the same name. The film was released in the US on 8 June 1990.
The New York Times, the Toronto Star, the Toronto Sun and The Boston Globe all refused to publish advertisements for the film, while The Washington Post did.  The film was controversial upon its initial release because of its title and was boycotted by the NAACP.

Plot
In Montreal, two African men, Man (de Bankolé) and Bouba (Kotto), share an apartment. Man is a student and aspiring author while Bouba is an amateur philosopher. The film is a slice of life story about Man and Bouba's sexploits. Man (de Bankolé) spends most of his time flirting with women around the city with the philosophy that if he talks to as many girls as possible his chances of having sexual relations with them will be higher. In the movie, many of them do, and he gives them nicknames: "Miz Literature," "Miz Mystic," "Miz Redhead," and so on.  The story proceeds to document these short lived sexual relations with details on biracial sexual relations and stereotypes.

Reception
The film was seen by 128,006 people in France.

Awards
The film was nominated for two Genie Awards in the year 1990. The nominations were, Best screenplay adapted written by Dany Laferrière and Richard Sadler. The other nomination was for best original song, written by Claude Dubois and Dany Laferrière. The film did not win the awards.

References

Works cited

External reviews
 
 

1980s French-language films
Films set in Montreal
Films based on Canadian novels
1989 films
Canadian drama films
Quebec films
Black Canadian films
Race-related controversies in film
French-language Canadian films
1980s Canadian films